Samuel Rhea Gammon III (born January 22, 1924) is an American former diplomat who served as the United States Ambassador to Mauritius under the Carter Administration. He also served as the Deputy Chief of Mission in Paris under  ambassadors Kenneth Rush (1974–77) in France and Arthur Hartman (1977–81). He later resigned the ambassadorship, and was replaced by Robert C. F. Gordon. On February 15, 2012, he endowed a gift of $200,000 to the Department of History at Texas A&M University.

Gammon is a veteran of World War II, serving in the U.S. Army from 1943 to 1946. In 2020, it was reported that Gammon, aged 96, had donated an estate gift to Texas A&M University's Department of History to honour the memory of his father.

References

1924 births
Living people
Ambassadors of the United States to Mauritius
People from Sherman, Texas
United States Army personnel of World War II
American expatriates in France
20th-century American diplomats